Harry Mark Hamblin (born 13 October 1999) is an English professional footballer who plays as a midfielder.

Career
Hamblin started his football career at Southampton, progressing through the youth ranks to make his debut in the club's under-18s during the 2015–16 season. During the 2018–19 season he played regularly for the Saints under-23s. In July 2019, he went on a six-month loan to National League South side Bath City, making his debut against Braintree Town on 3 August 2019, and scoring his first goal for the club, an 87th-minute equalizer in a 2–2 draw against Eastbourne Borough, on 14 September 2019.

On 31 January 2020, he joined Macclesfield Town on a free transfer, making his Football League and club debut at Moss Rose the following day against Northampton Town.

He was released at the end of the 2019–20 season.

Career statistics

References

Living people
English footballers
Southampton F.C. players
Bath City F.C. players
Macclesfield Town F.C. players
English Football League players
Association football midfielders
National League (English football) players
1999 births